Trike is a single released by Australian rock band You Am I in 1997. It was released to make two tracks ("Trike" and "Opportunities") that were added to the international release of Hourly, Daily available to Australian fans, along with three extra B-sides. "Trike" and "Opportunities" were recorded in late 1996 and replaced "Someone Else's Home" and "Moon Shines on Trubble" from the Australian release.

Track listing
 "Trike" – 2:57
 "Opportunities" – 2:46
 "Who Turned Out The Lights" – 4:28
 "I Can Hear The Grass Grow" – 3:26
 "(There's Gonna Be A) Showdown" – 4:19

"Who Turned Out The Lights" is a You Am I original.

"I Can Hear The Grass Grow" is a cover of The Move song.

"(There's Gonna Be A) Showdown" is a cover of the Gamble and Huff song first recorded by Archie Bell & The Drells but then later covered by New York Dolls.

References

1997 singles
You Am I songs
1997 songs
Songs written by Tim Rogers (musician)